The Amazigh of Jerba identify as Berbers. As a result, their culture is starkly different from mainstream Tunisian society.

Berber peoples and tribes